Hicks is a surname.

Hicks may also refer to:

Hicks, Louisiana, an unincorporated community
Hicks, Ohio, an unincorporated community
Hicks City, Missouri, an unincorporated community
Hicks Island (New York)
Hicks Island, Australia
HM Capital Partners, a private US equity firm, formerly "Hicks, Muse, Tate & Furst"

See also
Hick (disambiguation)
Higgs (disambiguation)

fr:Hicks
it:Hicks
ja:ヒックス
pt:Hicks
ru:Хикс
fi:Hicks